Alexander Varakin (born 17 February 1996) is a Kazakhstani swimmer. He competed in the men's 50 metre freestyle event at the 2018 FINA World Swimming Championships (25 m), in Hangzhou, China.

References

1996 births
Living people
Kazakhstani male freestyle swimmers
Place of birth missing (living people)
21st-century Kazakhstani people
Swimmers at the 2018 Asian Games
Asian Games bronze medalists for Kazakhstan
Asian Games medalists in swimming
Medalists at the 2018 Asian Games